A ceremonial mace is a highly ornamented staff of metal or wood, carried before a sovereign or other high officials in civic ceremonies by a mace-bearer, intended to represent the official's authority. The mace, as used today, derives from the original mace used as a weapon. Processions often feature maces, as on parliamentary or formal academic occasions.

History

Ancient Near East

Ceremonial maces originated in the Ancient Near East, where they were used as symbols of rank and authority across the region during the late Stone Age, Bronze Age, and early Iron Age. Among the oldest known ceremonial maceheads are the Ancient Egyptian Scorpion Macehead and Narmer Macehead; both are elaborately engraved with royal scenes, although their precise role and symbolism are obscure. In later Mesopotamian art, the mace is more clearly associated with authority; by the Old Babylonian period the most common figure on cylinder seals (a type of seal used to authenticate clay documents) is a repeated type now known as "The Figure with Mace" who wears a royal hat, holds a mace in his left hand, and is thought to represent a generic king. Ceremonial maces are also prominently depicted in the royal art of Ancient Assyria, such as the Stela of Ashurnasirpal II and the Stela of Shamshi-Adad V, in which the Assyrian kings are shown performing rites or making religious gestures while holding a mace to symbolise their authority.

Eastern Roman Empire

Some officials of the medieval Eastern Roman Empire carried maces for either practical or ceremonial purposes. Notable among the latter is the protoallagator, a military-judicial position that existed by about the 10th century A.D. and whose symbols of office were reported by the Palaiologan writer Pseudo-Kodinos in the 14th century to include a silver-gilt mace (matzouka). At this time the duties of the protoallagator included commanding the Byzantine Emperor's personal allagion, his military retinue. The ceremonial function of the mace may have passed to the late Roman Empire from the ancient Near East by way of Persia, and from there to other European cultures.

Medieval and Renaissance Europe

The earliest ceremonial maces in France and England were practical weapons intended to protect the King's person, borne by the Sergeants-at-Arms, a royal bodyguard established in France by Philip II, and in England probably by Richard I, (c. 1180). By the 14th century, these sergeants' maces had started to become increasingly decorative, encased in precious metals. As a weapon, the mace fell out of use with the disappearance of heavy armour.

The history of the civic mace (carried by the sergeants-at-arms) begins around the middle of the 13th century, though no examples from that period remain today. The oldest civic mace in England (still remaining today) is that of Hedon. It was granted (along with an important charter) in 1415. At the time, ornamented civic maces were considered an infringement of one of the privileges of the king's sergeants, who alone deserved to bear maces enriched with costly metals, according to a House of Commons petition of 1344. However, the sergeants of London later gained this privilege, as did later those of York (1396), Norwich (1403–1404), and Chester (1506). Records exist of maces covered with silver in use at Exeter in 1387–1388; Norwich bought two in 1435, and Launceston others in 1467 and 1468. Several other cities and towns subsequently acquired silver maces, and the 16th century saw almost universal use.

Early in the 15th century, the flanged end of the mace (the head of the war mace) was carried uppermost, with the small button bearing the royal arms in the base. By the beginning of the Tudor period, however, the blade-like flanges, originally made for offence, degenerated into mere ornaments, while the increased importance of the end with the royal arms (afterwards enriched with a cresting) resulted in the reversal of the position. The custom of carrying the flanged end upward did not die out at once: a few maces, such as the Winchcombe silver maces, which date from the end of the 15th century, were made to be carried both ways. The Guildford mace provides one of the finest of the fifteen specimens of the 15th century.

Craftsmen often pierced and decorated the flanged ends of the maces of this period beautifully. These flanges gradually became smaller, and by the 16th or early 17th century had developed into pretty projecting scroll-brackets and other ornaments, which remained in vogue until about 1640. The next development in the embellishment of the shaft was the reappearance of these small scroll-brackets on the top, immediately under the head of the mace. They disappear altogether from the foot in the last half of the 17th century, and remain only under the heads, or, in rarer instances, on a knob on the shaft. The silver mace-heads were mostly plain, with a cresting of leaves or flowers in the 15th and 16th centuries. In the reign of James I of England they began to be engraved and decorated with heraldic devices and similar ornamentation.

As the custom of having sergeants' maces began to die out about 1650, the large maces borne before the mayor or bailiffs came into general use. Thomas Maundy functioned as the chief maker of maces during the Commonwealth of England. He made the mace for the House of Commons in 1649. This mace is still in use today, though without the original head. The original head, which was not engraved with regal symbols, was replaced by one with regal symbols at the time of the Restoration of the monarchy. Oliver Cromwell referred to the House of Commons mace as "a fool's bauble" when he dissolved the Rump Parliament in 1653.

Commonwealth 

Most Commonwealth countries were formerly part of the British Empire and continue the tradition of using a mace, especially to represent the authority of the Sovereign in the parliaments of the Commonwealth realms.

United Kingdom 

In the United Kingdom there are thirteen surviving royal maces in the Crown Jewels, ten of which are kept in the Jewel House at the Tower of London, while three are on permanent loan to the Houses of Parliament. The House of Commons can only operate lawfully when the royal mace – dating from the reign of Charles II – is present at the table. Two other maces dating from the reigns of Charles II and William III are used by the House of Lords: One is placed on the Woolsack before the House meets and is absent when a monarch is there in person. Two maces from the Jewel House are carried in the royal procession at State Openings of Parliament and British coronations. The Scottish Parliament and the Senedd (Welsh Parliament) have their own maces, as do local councils, mayors, and some universities.

Australia 

The ceremonial maces of the Australian House of Representatives and the Australian Senate symbolise both the authority of each chamber and the royal authority of Australia's monarch.

Senate 

The ceremonial mace of the Australian Senate is the Black Rod. The ceremonial custodian of the Black Rod is the Usher of the Black Rod.

House of Representatives 

The Serjeant-at-Arms of the Australian House of Representatives is the ceremonial custodian of the Mace of the House. At the beginning and end of every day the House sits, the Speaker of the House enters and leaves the House preceded by the Serjeant-at-Arms carrying the mace on his or her right shoulder. The current mace is made of gilded silver, and was a gift to the House from King George VI on the occasion of the 50th anniversary of Federation in 1951. It was presented to the House by a delegation of members of the British House of Commons.

In May 1914, Labor MP William Higgs played a practical joke on the House by hiding the mace under one of the opposition frontbenches. It was not found for two hours, and police were called in as it was assumed to have been stolen. After initially denying his role in the incident, Higgs apologised to his colleagues the following week, stating he had acted in "a spirit of frivolity". His admission that he was "entirely to blame" was met with cheers.

Queensland Parliament 

A silver-gilt mace was produced for the Queensland Parliament in 1978 by Marples and Beasley of Birmingham, United Kingdom. The mace is inlaid with 15 sapphires, 9 opals, 6 amethysts and 2 garnets, all originating from the state of Queensland.

Bahamas 

The ceremonial maces in the Bahamas symbolise both the authority of each chamber and the Royal authority of Charles III, the King of the Bahamas.

On 27 April 1965, a day known in the Bahamas as "Black Tuesday", Lynden Pindling, then Opposition Leader, threw the 165-year-old Speaker's Mace out of a House of Assembly window to protest against the unfair gerrymandering of constituency boundaries by the then ruling United Bahamian Party (UBP) government. The Speaker tried to restore order but he was reminded by Labour leader Randol Fawkes that the business of the House could not legally continue without the mace. The badly damaged mace was recovered by the police and returned to the House.

The House of Assembly reconvened with a temporary wooden mace loaned by Canada; this was the same temporary mace used by the House of Commons of Canada after it lost its own mace to a fire in 1916. The temporary mace ultimately returned to Canada freshly gilded. In November 1975, the House of Commons of the United Kingdom donated a new mace to the House of Assembly.

On 3 December 2001, Cassius Stuart and Omar Smith, leader and deputy leader of the Bahamas Democratic Movement, a minor political party, charged from the public gallery onto the floor of the House of Assembly and handcuffed themselves to the Mace in protest against "unfair gerrymandering" of constituency boundaries by the Free National Movement (FNM) government. The Mace was unable to be separated from the men and the sitting of the House had to be suspended. The pair were jailed for almost two days but no charges were brought against them.

Canada 

The ceremonial maces in the Canadian Senate and House of Commons embody the authority each chamber derives from the country's sovereign. The current mace in the Commons is the fourth mace, a replica of the third one destroyed by fire at the Centre Block in 1916.

A similar practice is employed in each of the provincial and territorial legislatures, with a mace representing the sovereign's authority and power in each of the respective legislatures.

Protocol surrounding the mace 

In Canada, each of the legislatures follow a relatively standard protocol in relation to the ceremonial mace; the speaker of the house normally enters following a mace-bearer (normally the sergeant-at-arms), who subsequently sets the mace on the clerks' table to begin the sitting. When the sergeant-at-arms removes the mace from the table, the House has either adjourned, recessed, or been resolved into a committee of the whole. Before the reigning monarch or one of his or her representatives (the governor general or one of the lieutenant governors) may enter a legislative chamber, the mace must be completely hidden from view. This is done by draping the mace in a heavy velvet cloth, a procedure performed by the house pages. During the election of the speaker, the mace is removed from the table to show that the house is not fully constituted until the new speaker takes the chair and the mace is laid on the table.

History of the maces 

The oldest documented use of a ceremonial mace in a legislature of a British North American colony was at the 1st General Assembly of Nova Scotia, which convened in 1758. The first mace was used by the Chamber of Upper Canada's first Parliament in 1792 at Newark (now Niagara-on-the-Lake) and then moved to York (now Toronto). This first mace was a primitive wooden implement, painted red and gilt and surmounted by a crown of thin brass strips. It was stolen by American troops as a prize of war during the Battle of York of the War of 1812 in 1813. The mace was stored at the United States Naval Academy in Annapolis, Maryland, and remained in the United States until 1934. It was returned to Ontario when President Franklin Roosevelt sent an order to Congress to return the mace. It was stored at the Royal Ontario Museum for a time, and is now located in the Main Lobby of the Ontario Legislative Building.

A second mace was introduced in 1813 and used until 1841.

The third mace was not purchased until 1845. In 1849, when the Parliament for the United Province of Canada was sitting in Montreal, it was stolen by a riotous mob, apparently intent upon destroying it in a public demonstration. It was rescued and returned to the Speaker, Sir Allan MacNab, the next day. Later, in 1854, the mace was twice rescued when the Parliament Buildings in Quebec were ravaged by fire. The mace continued to be used by the Legislative Assembly in Toronto, Quebec City and Ottawa until Confederation in 1867. The new House of Commons of Canada then adopted the mace, where it remained until 1916. The mace of the House of Commons was destroyed when the Centre Block burned down in 1916; all that remained was a fist-sized ball of silver and gold. In the immediate aftermath, the House of Commons used the surviving Senate mace, then the mace of the Ontario provincial legislature for three weeks, after which a wooden mace (later loaned to the Bahamas) was crafted and used. In June 1916, the City of London donated a new mace made with the remains of the one destroyed; this mace continues to serve.

Being a symbol of the power and authority of a legislative assembly, a precedent was set in 2002 as to the severity of acts of disrespect toward the mace in Canada and, by proxy, the monarch. After Keith Martin, federal Member of Parliament for Esquimalt—Juan de Fuca, seized the ceremonial mace of the House of Commons from the clerk's table on April 17, 2002, the speaker of that chamber ruled that a prima facie breach of the privileges of the house had occurred, and contempt of the house been committed. Martin was not permitted to resume his seat until he had issued a formal apology from the bar of the house, pursuant to a motion passed in response to the incident.

Parliament of Ontario 

The ceremonial mace of the Legislative Assembly is the fourth mace to be used in Upper Canada or Ontario. The first, second and third maces are mentioned above, and were used by the Parliament of Upper Canada and Union Parliament. Only the first survived with second unaccounted and third mostly destroyed in 1916 with remains used to produce the current House of Commons' mace.

After Confederation, the third mace was adopted by the new House of Commons of Canada. The current mace used in the Legislative Assembly was acquired in 1867. It was provided by Charles E. Zollikofer of Ottawa for $200. The  mace is made of copper and richly gilded, a flattened ball at the butt end. Initially, the head of the mace bore the crown of Queen Victoria and in a cup with her monogram, V.R. When she was succeeded by Edward VII in 1901, her crown and cup were removed and a new one bearing Edward's initials on the cup was installed. Eventually, it was replaced with the current cup which is adorned in gleaming brass leaves.

Through some careful detective work on the part of Legislative Assembly staff, the original cup with Queen Victoria's monogram was recently found in the Royal Ontario Museum's collection and returned to the Legislature. It is now on display in the Legislative Building.

In 2009, two diamonds were installed in the mace. The diamonds were a gift to the people of Ontario from De Beers Canada to mark the opening of the Victor Mine near Attawapiskat First Nation in northern Ontario. Three diamonds were selected from the first run of the mine. Two stones, one rough and one polished, were set in platinum in the crown of the mace while the third stone, also polished, was put on exhibit in the lobby of the Legislative Building as part of a display about the history of the mace.

Parliament of Quebec 

The ceremonial mace of the National Assembly was made by Charles O. Zollikoffer in 1867, after the transfer of the maces of the Province of Canada to the new federal parliament in Ottawa. The current mace is of gold with a crown and a cross on its top as well as the letters "ER" - added after 1952.

The mace was saved from a fire by Sergeant-at-Arms Gédéon Larocque in 1883 as well as recovered after being stolen in 1967.

Fiji 

On 10 October 1874, Fiji's former king, Seru Epenisa Cakobau, gave his war club to Queen Victoria when the Deed of Cession by which the sovereignty of Fiji passed to the British Crown was signed, and the war club was taken to Britain and kept at Windsor Castle. In October 1932, by a curious twist of fate, King Cakobau's war club was repatriated to Fiji, on behalf of the British king George V, for use as the ceremonial mace of the Legislative Council of Fiji.

Guyana 

The National Assembly, the sole chamber of the Parliament of Guyana, has a ceremonial mace. In March 1991, Isahak Basir, a member of the People's Progressive Party (in opposition at the time), was expelled from parliament for removing the mace from its place on the table, and also for throwing his drinking glass at the Speaker.

India 

The Parliament of India, the supreme legislative body of India, follows the Westminster system of government but does not have a ceremonial mace. The legislative bodies of several states, such as Tripura, have a ceremonial mace. The courts of various Indian princely states were recorded as having ceremonial maces too.

New Zealand 

A ceremonial mace for the New Zealand House of Representatives has been used since 1866, when one was presented to Parliament by former Speaker Sir Charles Clifford. The mace is considered to be a symbol of the authority of both the Speaker and of the House, and is carried by the Serjeant-at-Arms.

The first mace was destroyed on 11 December 1907 when a fire consumed most of Parliament Buildings. A wooden mace was temporarily used until a new mace was gifted by then Prime Minister Joseph Ward in 1909 at the prompting of Speaker Arthur Guinness. This mace is the one currently in use.

The present mace is modeled on that of the House of Commons of the United Kingdom, differing only in that one of the panels instead depicts the Southern Cross and the initials "NZ". The mace is 1.498 metres long, made of sterling silver coated with 18 carat gilt gold and weighs 8.164 kilograms.

Wellington

The capital city of Wellington also possesses a silver-gilt ceremonial mace, gifted to it by its sister city of Harrogate in 1954, which is used during meetings of the Wellington City Council and on ceremonial occasions.

South Africa 

As a Dominion of the British Empire, the Union of South Africa House of Assembly used a mace modelled on that of the UK House of Commons from 1910 to 1961. 

When South Africa became a republic outside the Commonwealth in 1961, a Stinkwood mace was used temporarily until 1963 when the Gold Producers’ Committee of the Transvaal and Orange Free State Chamber of Mines gifted a mace to the chamber.

In 2004 a new mace was designed to reflect the history, tradition, diversity, culture and languages of South Africa. Based on an aluminium shaft with a gold drum featuring images of working South Africans, the mace remains in use today as the symbol of the authority of the National Assembly of South Africa.

Sri Lanka 

The ceremonial jeweled mace, symbolizing the authority of the Parliament of Sri Lanka, is kept in the custody of the Serjeant-at-Arms. The mace, when kept on its stand in the Chamber, signifies that the House is in session. At the commencement of a Session, the Serjeant-at-Arms bearing the mace accompanies the Speaker when entering and leaving the Chamber. The mace has to be legally brought into the House at the appointed time and removed at the end of the Session. Therefore, unauthorized removal of the mace cannot invalidate proceedings.

Other Maces with Connection to the British Monarch 

There are two maces in Jamaica, made in 1753 and 1787; one belonging to the colony of Grenada, made in 1791, and the Speaker's Mace at Barbados, dating from 1812.

Ireland

Mace of former Parliament of Ireland 
In 1937, the Bank of Ireland bought the mace from the descendants of John Foster, its last Speaker, the House having ceased to exist upon the Acts of Union 1800. The bank paid IR£3,100 for the mace at a Christie's auction. In 2015, it represented Ireland at the 800th anniversary of the Lord Mayor's Show in the City of London.

The Great Mace of Dublin 
The Great Mace of Dublin is used at major civic and ceremonial events alongside the Great Sword, such as when the Lord Mayor awards the honorary Freedom of the City. It was made in 1717 and contains parts of an earlier mace made for the city's first Lord Mayor, Sir Daniel Bellingham.

Academic maces
The ceremonial mace of Trinity College Dublin was still in use in 2021, and University College Cork also has a mace and a mace-bearer.

Burma / Myanmar

A ceremonial mace was an essential item of the regalia of Myanmar’s legislative bodies during the British colonial period. It kept its significance and symbolism in the early post-independence legislatures. Parliamentary democracy ceased in 1962, but when the regime of General Ne Win revived a one-party unicameral legislature in 1974, the mace-bearing ceremonial was abandoned. It was re-introduced in the new parliament, or Pyidaungsu Hluttaw, convened under the 2008 National Constitution.

Philippines

The House of Representatives and the Senate of the Philippines each have a respective mace. The maces are almost identical.

The mace of the House of Representatives serves as a symbol of authority and in the custody of the Sergeant-at-Arms. It serves as a guarantee for the Sergeant-at-Arms in enforcing peace and order in the House upon the Speaker's instruction. Upon every session, the mace is placed at the foot of the Speaker's rostrum. The mace is topped by the official seal of the House of Representatives.

The mace of the Senate serves as a symbol of authority. It is displayed at the Senate President's rostrum every session. As with the House of Representatives, the Sergeant-at-Arms also serves as the custodian of the mace. When there is disorderly conduct in the Senate, the Sergeant-at-Arms brings the mace from its pedestal and presents it to the senators causing the disorder, a signal to stop such behavior. The official seal of the Senate tops the mace.

Provincial boards, city and municipal councils also have their own mace.

The constitutional body Commission on Appointments also uses their own mace during their plenary sessions.

United States

The civic maces of the 18th century follow the British type, with some modifications in shape and ornamentation, but most (with the exception of Virginia and South Carolina) incorporate republican imagery as opposed to the monarchical imagery of the previous maces, although arguably imperial Roman imagery is what most influenced their form. Examples of English silver maces in North America include one dating to 1753 at Norfolk, Virginia, and the mace of the state of South Carolina, dating to 1756. The Maryland House of Delegates also has a very old ceremonial mace, although it is the plainest of all, having no ornamentation save some carved vegetation designs at its head.

The current Mace of the United States House of Representatives has been in use since December 1, 1842. It was created by William Adams at a cost of $400 to replace the first mace, which was destroyed on August 24, 1814, when the Capitol was destroyed in the burning of Washington by the British during the War of 1812. A simple wooden mace was used in the interim.

The current mace is nearly four feet tall and is composed of 13 ebony rods tied together with silver strands criss-crossed over the length of the staff. This design shows the staff with the appearance of a bundled fasces, sans ax, symbolizing unity, the rods representing the 13 original States. It is surmounted by a globus, symbolising dominion, and above that the American eagle with outstretched wings.

When the House is in session, the mace stands in a cylindrical pedestal of green marble to the right of the chair of the Speaker of the House. When the House is meeting as the Committee of the Whole, the mace is moved to a pedestal next to the desk of the Sergeant at Arms. Thus Representatives entering the chamber know with a glance whether the House is in session or in committee.

In accordance with the Rules of the House, when a Member becomes unruly the Sergeant at Arms, on order of the Speaker, lifts the mace from its pedestal and presents it before the offenders, thereby restoring order. This occurs very rarely.

Bands

Drum majors carry a mace to convey commands or signals to their band. According to the Royal Scottish Pipe Band Association, "Drum Major’s maces have been in existence since the 17th century".

Churches

Among other maces (more correctly described as staves) in use today are those carried before ecclesiastical dignitaries and clergy in cathedrals and some parish churches. Other churches, particularly churches of the Anglican Communion, a verger ceremoniously precedes processions.

In the Roman Catholic Church maces used to be carried before Popes and Cardinals. They have long since been replaced with processional crosses.

Universities

Ceremonial maces, symbols of the internal authority over members and the independence from external authority, are still used at many educational institutions, particularly universities. The University of St Andrews in Scotland has three maces dating from the 15th century. The university also has four other maces of a more recent origin. These are on permanent display at the Museum of the University of St Andrews. The University of Glasgow has one from the same period, which may be seen in its arms. University of Innsbruck and its sister Medical University are in possession of maces from 1572, 1588 and 1833, which were confiscated by the Habsburgs from the University of Olomouc in the 1850s.

At the University of Oxford there are three dating from the second half of the 16th century and six from 1723 and 1724, while at the University of Cambridge there are three from 1626 and one from 1628. The latter was altered during the Commonwealth of England and again at the Stuart Restoration. The mace of the general council of the University of Edinburgh has a three-sided head: one with the seal of the university; one with the university's coat of arms and the third with Edinburgh's coat of arms of the City of Edinburgh. The wood for the shaft of the mace is from Malabar and was presented by the Secretary of State for India (R. A. Cross) at the First International Forestry Exhibition (1884). The mace of the Open University reflects its modernist outlook, being made from titanium.

In the United States, almost all universities and free-standing colleges have a mace, used almost exclusively at commencement exercises and borne variously by the university or college president, chancellor, rector, provost, the marshal of the faculty, a dean or some other high official. In those universities that have a number of constituent colleges or faculties, each college, faculty or school often has a smaller mace, borne in procession by a dean, faculty member or sometimes a privileged student. In 1970, Cornell professor Morris Bishop was acting as marshal at a graduation ceremony when a radical student attempted to grab the microphone; Bishop fought him off with the mace.

In Canada, some universities have a mace that is used as part of the ceremonial process of conferring degrees during convocation and other special events. The mace is carried by a special university official like a beadle.

In South Korea, Pohang University of Science and Technology has a mace as a part of its ceremonial functions.

In the Philippines, the University of Santo Tomas has a pair of twin maces belonging to the Rector Magnificus. These symbolize his spiritual and temporal power as the highest authority of the university. Made of pure silver and measuring 95 centimeters by 15 centimeters in diameter, the maces have existed since the 17th century and have been used in academic processions ever since. Candidates for doctoral degrees were accompanied by the Rector in a parade called Paseo de los Doctores from Intramuros to Santo Domingo Church, where University commencement exercises were held until the 17th century. Today, faculty members hold processions at the opening of each academic year and during solemn investitures in academic gowns, following the style of Spanish academic regalia. The maces, carried by beadles or macebearers, were included in the parade for their academic symbolism.

Other maces

The mace of the Cork guilds, made by Robert Goble of Cork in 1696 for the associated guilds of which he had been master, is in the Victoria and Albert Museum. The museum also has a large silver mace dating to the middle of the 18th century, with the arms of Pope Benedict XIV. This mace is said to have been used at the coronation of Napoleon as King of the Napoleonic Kingdom of Italy at Milan in 1805.

The Judiciary of Hong Kong opens its legal year with a silver ceremonial mace carried by the mace bearer and used since the early 20th century with the butt end replaced with the emblem of the SAR in 1997. All of the court's maces (pre and post Handover) are held in the Exhibition Gallery.

Hetmans of Ukrainian Cossacks also had a ceremonial mace, called a bulava.

See also

Baton (symbol)
Ceremonial weapon
Sceptre
Staff of office
Heraldry

References

External links

Blunt weapons
Ceremonies
 
Formal insignia
State ritual and ceremonies
Parliamentary procedure